Jan Malík (born 7 April 1992) is a Czech professional footballer who plays as a midfielder.

Career
He made his debut in Czech First League on 22 May 2013 in the home match against Sparta.

On 27 June 2016, Malík signed for Bulgarian First League club Cherno More.  On 31 July 2016, he made his debut in a 3–1 away win against Pirin Blagoevgrad, coming on as substitute for Hugo Seco.  He was released in December.

On 3 March 2017, Malík joined Polish side Legionovia Legionowo.

References

External links
 
 
 Profile at FC Zbrojovka Brno official site 
 

1992 births
Living people
Footballers from Brno
Czech footballers
Czech Republic under-21 international footballers
Czech First League players
First Professional Football League (Bulgaria) players
FC Zbrojovka Brno players
PFC Cherno More Varna players
Legionovia Legionowo players
Czech expatriate footballers
Czech expatriate sportspeople in Bulgaria
Expatriate footballers in Bulgaria
Czech expatriate sportspeople in Poland
Expatriate footballers in Poland
Association football midfielders